An epicondyle is a rounded eminence on a bone that lies upon a condyle (epi-, "upon" + condyle, from a root meaning "knuckle" or "rounded articular area"). There are various epicondyles in the human skeleton, each named by its anatomic site. They include the following:

Skeletal system